This is a list of municipalities in Romania which have standing links to local communities in other countries known as "town twinning" (usually in Europe) or "sister cities" (usually in the rest of the world).

A
Aiud

 Cherepovets, Russia
 Cusset, France
 Dingelstädt, Germany
 Gyomaendrőd, Hungary
 Megara, Greece
 Ponte de Sor, Portugal
 Siklós, Hungary
 Soltvadkert, Hungary

Alba Iulia

 Aigio, Greece
 Alcalá de Henares, Spain
 Alessandria, Italy
 Arnsberg, Germany
 Biograd na Moru, Croatia
 Cetinje, Montenegro
 Chișinău, Moldova
 Düzce, Turkey
 Lanzhou, China
 Nof HaGalil, Israel

 Sliven, Bulgaria
 Székesfehérvár, Hungary
 Varese, Italy
 Viadana, Italy

Aleșd
 Stará Ľubovňa, Slovakia

Alexandria
 Morlaix, France

Arad

 Atlit (Hof HaCarmel), Israel
 Bethlehem, Palestine
 Fushun, China
 Givatayim, Israel
 Gyula, Hungary
 Heist-op-den-Berg, Belgium
 Hegyvidék (Budapest), Hungary
 Hódmezővásárhely, Hungary
 Pécs, Hungary
 Prague 5 (Prague), Czech Republic
 Rîșcani (Chișinău), Moldova
 Zrenjanin, Serbia

B
Bacău

 Blaj, Romania
 Petah Tikva, Israel

Baia Mare

 Bielsko-Biała, Poland
 Combs-la-Ville, France
 Hódmezővásárhely, Hungary
 Hollywood, United States
 Kitwe, Zambia
 Nyíregyháza, Hungary
 Serino, Italy
 Szolnok, Hungary
 Wels, Austria

Bălan
 Kőbánya (Budapest), Hungary

Bălăușeri

 Aalsmeer, Netherlands
 Aldebrő, Hungary
 Fót, Hungary
 Kisbárapáti, Hungary
 Somogyvár, Hungary
 Tápiószentmárton, Hungary

Baraolt

 Bucine, Italy
 Dabas, Hungary
 Budafok-Tétény (Budapest), Hungary
 Sarkad, Hungary
 Štúrovo, Slovakia
 Szarvas, Hungary
 Zalaegerszeg, Hungary
 Zirc, Hungary

Bârlad

 Selçuklu, Turkey
 Vergèze, France

Beiuș

 Békéscsaba, Hungary
 Green, United States
 Komló, Hungary
 Méhkerék, Hungary

Bistrița

 L'Aquila, Italy
 Besançon, France
 Columbus, United States
 Herzogenrath, Germany
 Rehovot, Israel
 Wels, Austria
 Wiehl, Germany
 Zielona Góra, Poland

Blaj

 Allschwil, Switzerland
 Bacău, Romania
 Durlești, Moldova
 Morlanwelz, Belgium
 Recanati, Italy

Bocșa

 Petrovac, Serbia
 La Valette-du-Var, France

Boldești-Scăeni

 Češinovo-Obleševo, North Macedonia
 Leova, Moldova
 Pavlikeni, Bulgaria

Borșa
 Rokiškis, Lithuania

Botiza
 Solotvyno, Ukraine

Botoșani

 Karaman, Turkey
 Laval, Canada

Brădești

 Andornaktálya, Hungary
 Szászvár, Hungary
 Tóalmás, Hungary

Bradu
 Rixensart, Belgium

Brăila

 Argostoli, Greece
 Beşiktaş, Turkey
 Calais, France
 Denizli, Turkey
 Katerini, Greece
 Nilüfer, Turkey
 Pleven, Bulgaria

Brașov

 Bijeljina, Bosnia and Herzegovina
 Cleveland, United States
 Győr, Hungary
 Holstebro, Denmark
 Linz, Austria

 Rishon LeZion, Israel
 Tampere, Finland
 Tours, France

Brețcu

 Hódmezővásárhely, Hungary
 Tótkomlós, Hungary

Brezoi
 La Bouilladisse, France

Bucharest

 Amman, Jordan
 Ankara, Turkey
 Atlanta, United States
 Athens, Greece
 Beijing, China
 Chișinău, Moldova
 Damascus, Syria
 Kyiv, Ukraine
 Lagos, Nigeria
 Moscow, Russia
 Nicosia, Cyprus
 Pretoria, South Africa
 Sofia, Bulgaria
 Tbilisi, Georgia

Buzău

 Agios Dimitrios, Greece
 Oudenaarde, Belgium
 Soroca, Moldova

C
Calafat

 Almenno San Bartolomeo, Italy
 Kozloduy, Bulgaria
 Duiven, Netherlands

Călărași

 Bielsk Podlaski, Poland
 Călărași, Moldova
 Hengyang, China

 Raslavice, Slovakia
 Razgrad, Bulgaria
 Silistra, Bulgaria
 Svietlahorsk, Belarus
 Zaječar, Serbia

Câmpia Turzii

 Bayramiç, Turkey
 Kisbér, Hungary
 Mohács, Hungary
 Putten, Netherlands
 La Salvetat-Saint-Gilles, France
 San Fernando de Henares, Spain
 Siemianowice Śląskie, Poland

Câmpulung

 Dison, Belgium
 Popovo, Bulgaria
 Soissons, France

Câmpulung Moldovenesc

 Avezzano, Italy
 Dąbrowa Górnicza, Poland
 Karmiel, Israel

Caracal

 Białogard, Poland
 Cherven Bryag, Bulgaria

 Montana, Bulgaria

Carei

 Mátészalka, Hungary
 Nyírbátor, Hungary
 Orosháza, Hungary

Cârța

 Fertőrákos, Hungary
 Helvécia, Hungary
 Mernye, Hungary
 Zatín, Slovakia

Cernavodă

 Krško, Slovenia
 Saint-Sébastien-sur-Loire, France

Ciceu

 Bogyiszló, Hungary
 Dębica (rural gmina), Poland
 Kétpó, Hungary
 Tápiószecső, Hungary
 Újszász, Hungary
 Zugló (Budapest), Hungary

Cisnădie

 Château-Thierry, France
 Hola Prystan, Ukraine
 Wernigerode, Germany

Ciumani

 Baktalórántháza, Hungary
 Dány, Hungary
 Erdőbénye, Hungary
 Heves, Hungary
 Nenince, Slovakia
 Ráckeve, Hungary
 Totovo Selo (Kanjiža), Serbia

Cluj-Napoca

 Beersheba, Israel
 Braga, Portugal
 Chacao (Caracas), Venezuela
 Cologne, Germany
 Columbia, United States
 Dijon, France
 East Lansing, United States
 Eskişehir, Turkey
 Karaganda, Kazakhstan
 Korçë, Albania
 Makati, Philippines
 Namur, Belgium
 Nantes, France
 Ningbo, China
 Parma Province, Italy
 Pécs, Hungary
 Rockford, United States
 Rotherham, England, United Kingdom
 São Paulo, Brazil
 Suwon, South Korea
 Ungheni, Moldova
 Viterbo, Italy
 Zagreb, Croatia
 Zhengzhou, China

Comarnic
 Savigny-le-Temple, France

Constanța

 Alexandria, Egypt
 Brest, France
 Callao, Peru
 Cartagena, Colombia
 Fort Lauderdale, United States
 Havana, Cuba
 Istanbul, Turkey
 İzmir, Turkey
 Makassar, Indonesia
 Mobile, United States
 Novorossiysk, Russia
 Odessa, Ukraine
 Rotterdam, Netherlands
 Saint Petersburg, Russia
 Santos, Brazil
 Shanghai, China
 Silivri, Turkey
 Sulmona, Italy
 Tepebaşı, Turkey
 Thessaloniki, Greece
 Trapani, Italy
 Turku, Finland
 Yokohama, Japan

Covasna

 Balatonfüred, Hungary
 Călărași, Moldova
 Csenger, Hungary
 Gyula, Hungary
 Nagykanizsa, Hungary
 Pápa, Hungary

Craiova

 Kuopio, Finland
 Nanterre, France
 Shiyan, China
 Skopje, North Macedonia
 Vratsa, Bulgaria

Cristuru Secuiesc

 Ajka, Hungary
 Csurgó, Hungary
 Derecske, Hungary
 Dévaványa, Hungary
 Dunakeszi, Hungary
 Kalocsa, Hungary
 Karcag, Hungary
 Kunszentmiklós, Hungary
 Lánycsók, Hungary
 Moldava nad Bodvou, Slovakia
 Pesterzsébet (Budapest), Hungary
 Senta, Serbia
 Somogybabod, Hungary

Cugir
 Wasserburg am Inn, Germany

Curtea de Argeș

 Nevers, France
 San Giuliano Milanese, Italy

D
Dăbuleni
 Vaugneray, France

Dej

 Balassagyarmat, Hungary
 Beauvais, France
 Dalfsen, Netherlands
 Le Quesnoy, France

 Tokaj, Hungary

Deva

 Arras, France
 Cherbourg-en-Cotentin, France
 Szigetvár, Hungary
 Yancheng, China

Diosig

 Fontenay-le-Comte, France
 Sládkovičovo, Slovakia

Dorohoi

 Cholet, France
 Drochia, Moldova
 Hertsa, Ukraine

 Vaiano, Italy

Drobeta-Turnu Severin
 Orly, France

Dumbrăvița

 Sándorfalva, Hungary
 Szentes, Hungary
 Žitište, Serbia

F
Focșani

 Majdanpek, Serbia
 Tivoli, Italy

G
Galați

 Ancona, Italy
 Brindisi, Italy
 Coventry, England, United Kingdom
 Hammond, United States
 Limón, Costa Rica
 Mumbai, India
 Mykolaiv, Ukraine
 Pessac, France
 Piraeus, Greece
 Sevastopol, Ukraine
 Scottsbluff, United States
 Wuhan, China

Gănești

 Csepel (Budapest), Hungary
 Magyarcsanád, Hungary
 Nagyhegyes, Hungary
 Tiszalúc, Hungary
 Vámosatya, Hungary

Gheorgheni

 Bačka Topola, Serbia
 Békés, Hungary
 Belváros-Lipótváros (Budapest), Hungary
 Cegléd, Hungary
 Eger, Hungary
 Kiskunmajsa, Hungary
 Rákosmente (Budapest), Hungary
 Šamorín, Slovakia
 Siófok, Hungary
 Szigetszentmiklós, Hungary

Gherla

 Forchheim, Germany
 Ronneby, Sweden
 Yzeure, France

Giurgiu

 Dunaújváros, Hungary
 Izmail, Ukraine
 Ruse, Bulgaria

H
Hodod
 Szihalom, Hungary

Horezu

 Clervaux, Luxembourg
 La Destrousse, France

Huedin

 Cassina de' Pecchi, Italy
 Derecske, Hungary
 Enying, Hungary
 Jerash, Jordan
 Leányfalu, Hungary
 Leżajsk, Poland
 Manthelan, France
 Novoselytsia, Ukraine
 Tépe, Hungary

Hunedoara

 Argenteuil, France
 Derince, Turkey
 Kaihua, China
 Parga, Greece
 Szombathely, Hungary
 Zenica, Bosnia and Herzegovina

I
Iași

 Ashdod, Israel
 Athens, United States
 Chernivtsi, Ukraine
 Chișinău, Moldova
 Filacciano, Italy
 Forano, Italy
 Ilioupoli, Greece
 Isfahan, Iran
 Jericho, Palestine
 Monterrey, Mexico
 Morlupo, Italy
 Nazzano, Italy
 Padua, Italy
 Peristeri, Greece
 Poitiers, France
 Sant'Oreste, Italy
 Torrita Tiberina, Italy
 Veliko Tarnovo, Bulgaria
 Villeneuve-d'Ascq, France

 Xi'an, China

Ibănești is a member of the Charter of European Rural Communities, a town twinning association across the European Union, alongside with:

 Bienvenida, Spain
 Bièvre, Belgium
 Bucine, Italy
 Cashel, Ireland
 Cissé, France
 Desborough, England, United Kingdom
 Esch (Haaren), Netherlands
 Hepstedt, Germany
 Kandava (Tukums), Latvia
 Kannus, Finland
 Kolindros, Greece
 Lassee, Austria
 Medzev, Slovakia
 Moravče, Slovenia
 Næstved, Denmark
 Nagycenk, Hungary
 Nadur, Malta
 Ockelbo, Sweden
 Pano Lefkara, Cyprus
 Põlva, Estonia
 Samuel (Soure), Portugal
 Slivo Pole, Bulgaria
 Starý Poddvorov, Czech Republic
 Strzyżów, Poland
 Tisno, Croatia
 Troisvierges, Luxembourg
 Žagarė (Joniškis), Lithuania

Iernut
 Sint-Katelijne-Waver, Belgium

Iratoșu
 Dombegyház, Hungary

J
Jimbolia

 Csanádpalota, Hungary
 Dunajská Streda, Slovakia
 Kikinda, Serbia
 Mórahalom, Hungary
 Pusztamérges, Hungary
 Trebur, Germany

L
Lipova

 Battonya, Hungary
 Castelvetro di Modena, Italy
 Csanádpalota, Hungary
 Salindres, France

Lugoj

 Corinth, Greece
 Jena, Germany
 Kriva Palanka, North Macedonia
 Makó, Hungary
 Monopoli, Italy
 Nisporeni, Moldova
 Orléans, France
 Szekszárd, Hungary
 Veliko Gradište, Serbia
 Vršac, Serbia

Lupeni
 Kecel, Hungary

M
Măcin
 Blaye, France

Maieru
 Nort-sur-Erdre, France

Mangalia

 Aywaille, Belgium
 Balchik, Bulgaria
 Banská Bystrica, Slovakia
 Byblos, Lebanon

 General Toshevo, Bulgaria
 Greenport, United States
 Karmiel, Israel
 Laurium, Greece
 Pale (Istočno Sarajevo), Bosnia and Herzegovina
 Piran, Slovenia
 Porto Viro, Italy
 Santa Severina, Italy
 Struga, North Macedonia

Marghita

 Berettyóújfalu, Hungary
 Kiskőrös, Hungary

Mediaș

 Cricova, Moldova
 Dąbrowa Górnicza, Poland
 De Fryske Marren, Netherlands

 Mineral Wells, United States
 Sopron, Hungary
 Wittenberg, Germany

Miercurea Ciuc

 Bălți, Moldova
 Bečej, Serbia
 Budakeszi, Hungary
 Cegléd, Hungary
 Gödöllő, Hungary
 Gyula, Hungary
 Heves, Hungary
 Kaposvár, Hungary
 Makó, Hungary
 Óbuda-Békásmegyer (Budapest), Hungary
 Riehen, Switzerland
 Székesfehérvár, Hungary
 Tiszaújváros, Hungary
 Želiezovce, Slovakia

Miercurea Nirajului

 Aszód, Hungary
 Csorna, Hungary
 Hajdúdorog, Hungary
 Mór, Hungary
 Örkény, Hungary
 Simontornya, Hungary
 Szerencs, Hungary

Mioveni

 Landerneau, France
 Măgdăcești, Moldova
 Petrich, Bulgaria

Moreni
 Torres Novas, Portugal

N
Nădlac

 Brezno, Slovakia
 Budmerice, Slovakia
 Jelšava, Slovakia
 Kovačica, Serbia
 Krompachy, Slovakia
 Nagylak, Hungary
 Nový Bydžov, Czech Republic
 Pukanec, Slovakia
 Tótkomlós, Hungary
 Východná, Slovakia

Năsăud

 Alexandreia, Greece
 Kavadarci, North Macedonia
 Mandello del Lario, Italy
 Mława, Poland

Năvodari

 Gemlik, Turkey
 Kavarna, Bulgaria
 Kruševo, North Macedonia
 Rîșcani, Moldova
 Teruel, Spain

Negrești-Oaș

 Alter do Chão, Portugal
 Csenger, Hungary
 Guidel, France
 Tiachiv, Ukraine

O
Odorheiu Secuiesc

 Barcs, Hungary
 Békéscsaba, Hungary
 Berehove, Ukraine
 Budapest, Hungary
 Budavár (Budapest), Hungary
 Cegléd, Hungary
 Dunajská Streda, Slovakia
 Hajdúdorog, Hungary
 Keszthely, Hungary
 Soroksár (Budapest), Hungary
 Subotica, Serbia
 Tatabánya, Hungary
 Tihany, Hungary
 Törökbálint, Hungary
 Vác, Hungary

Onești

 Edineț, Moldova
 Eysines, France
 Skien, Norway
 Strășeni, Moldova

Oradea

 Ceyrat, France
 Coslada, Spain
 Debrecen, Hungary
 Givatayim, Israel
 Mantua, Italy

Orăștie

 Criuleni, Moldova
 Fenouillet, France
 Helmstedt, Germany
 Jerash, Jordan
 Rahat, Israel
 Sliedrecht, Netherlands

Ovidiu

 Küçükkuyu (Ayvacık), Turkey
 Sulmona, Italy

Ozun

 Alsótold, Hungary
 Csorvás, Hungary
 Fácánkert, Hungary
 Mezőhegyes, Hungary
 Nagykáta, Hungary
 Tolna, Hungary

P
Pantelimon
 Văsieni, Moldova

Pașcani

 Ialoveni, Moldova
 Pașcani, Moldova

Pecica

 Battonya, Hungary
 Woluwe-Saint-Pierre, Belgium

Petroșani

 Bansko, Bulgaria
 Nova Zagora, Bulgaria
 Ponte nelle Alpi, Italy
 Smedjebacken, Sweden
 Várpalota, Hungary

Piatra Neamț

 Alpharetta, United States
 Beinasco, Italy
 Bergama, Turkey
 Edineț, Moldova
 Hlyboka, Ukraine
 Kiryat Malakhi, Israel
 Lod, Israel
 Mably, France
 Manilva, Spain
 Orhei, Moldova
 Riorges, France
 Roanne, France
 Verbania, Italy
 Villerest, France

Pitești

 Beit Jala, Palestine
 Borlänge, Sweden
 Bydgoszcz, Poland
 Caserta, Italy
 Chongqing, China
 Gyumri, Armenia
 Kragujevac, Serbia
 Muntinlupa, Philippines
 Nafplio, Greece
 Ourém, Portugal
 Springfield, United States
 Tynaarlo, Netherlands

Ploiești

 Berat, Albania

 Harbin, China
 Hîncești, Moldova
 Lefkada, Greece
 Maracaibo, Venezuela
 Marousi, Greece
 Oral, Kazakhstan
 Osijek, Croatia
 Radom, Poland

Plopeni
 Millau, France

Popești-Leordeni
 Belene, Bulgaria

Praid

 Bodony, Hungary
 Emőd, Hungary
 Harsány, Hungary
 Környe, Hungary
 Mezőkovácsháza, Hungary
 Nádasd, Hungary
 Somogyjád, Hungary
 Szegvár, Hungary

Pucioasa

 Alcázar de San Juan, Spain
 Cartaxo, Portugal
 Jonava, Lithuania
 Vadul lui Vodă, Moldova

R
Rădăuți

 Briceni, Moldova
 Drochia, Moldova
 Kłodzko, Poland
 Kyrenia, Cyprus
 Pontault-Combault, France
 Ragusa, Italy

Râmnicu Vâlcea

 Agios Nikolaos, Greece
 Ciocana (Chișinău), Moldova
 Dura, Palestine
 Kalamata, Greece
 Kroměříž, Czech Republic
 Kruševac, Serbia

Râmnicu Sărat
 Edineț, Moldova

Reghin

 Bourg-la-Reine, France
 Érd, Hungary
 Lubaczów, Poland
 Nagykőrös, Hungary
 Salle, Italy
 Ungheni, Moldova

Reșița

 Baskil, Turkey
 Bihać, Bosnia and Herzegovina
 Caen, France
 Kikinda, Serbia
 Loreto, Italy
 Marijampolė, Lithuania
 Pančevo, Serbia
 Pesaro, Italy
 Požarevac, Serbia
 Veliko Gradište, Serbia
 Vrgorac, Croatia
 Vršac, Serbia

Roman

 Dilijan, Armenia
 Edineț, Moldova
 Gedera, Israel
 Grugliasco, Italy
 Ștefan Vodă, Moldova
 Sunchang, South Korea

Roșiorii de Vede
 Gorna Oryahovitsa, Bulgaria

Rovinari
 Turek, Poland

S
Săcele

 Edineț, Moldova
 Kisújszállás, Hungary
 Vire-Normandie, France

Salonta

 Csepel (Budapest), Hungary
 Hajdúböszörmény, Hungary
 Nagykőrös, Hungary
 Rimavská Sobota, Slovakia
 Sarkad, Hungary
 Túrkeve, Hungary

Sângeorgiu de Pădure

 Baja, Hungary
 Bélapátfalva, Hungary
 Celldömölk, Hungary
 Inke, Hungary
 Kovačica, Serbia
 Loireauxence, France
 Plan-les-Ouates, Switzerland

Sânnicolau Mare

 Burgkirchen an der Alz, Germany
 Kazincbarcika, Hungary
 Potenza Picena, Italy

Satu Mare

 Berehove, Ukraine
 Nyíregyháza, Hungary
 Rzeszów, Poland
 Wolfenbüttel, Germany

Sebeș

 Büdingen, Germany
 Komárno, Slovakia
 Komárom, Hungary
 Siderno, Italy
 Strășeni, Moldova

Seini

 Kalush, Ukraine
 Nyírmeggyes, Hungary
 Sárvár, Hungary

Sfântu Gheorghe

 Alsónána, Hungary
 Balatonszentgyörgy, Hungary
 Cegléd, Hungary
 Ferencváros (Budapest), Hungary
 Givatayim, Israel
 Kanjiža, Serbia
 Kecskemét, Hungary
 Kisbucsa, Hungary
 Kiskunhalas, Hungary
 Kráľovský Chlmec, Slovakia
 Mosonmagyaróvár, Hungary

 Saint-Georges-sur-Cher, France
 Santa Cruz, Portugal
 Sárpilis, Hungary
 Szentes, Hungary
 Veszprém, Hungary

Sibiu

 Columbia, United States
 Deventer, Netherlands
 Durham, United States
 Klagenfurt, Austria
 Landshut, Germany
 Marburg, Germany
 Rennes, France

Sighetu Marmației

 Khust, Ukraine
 Kiryat Yam, Israel
 Kolomyia, Ukraine
 Oława, Poland
 Saint-Hilaire-de-Riez, France

Sighișoara

 Blois, France
 Città di Castello, Italy
 Dinkelsbühl, Germany
 Kiskunfélegyháza, Hungary
 Raška, Serbia
 Sozopol, Bulgaria
 Zamość, Poland

Șimleu Silvaniei

 Albertirsa, Hungary
 Hajdúböszörmény, Hungary
 Nyírbátor, Hungary
 Petah Tikva, Israel
 Szarvas, Hungary
 Tiszavasvári, Hungary

Sinaia

 Aosta, Italy
 Athis-Mons, France
 Cascais, Portugal
 Castelbuono, Italy
 Cetinje, Montenegro
 Chornomorsk, Ukraine
 Dimona, Israel
 Gainesville, United States
 Kuşadası, Turkey

 Thame, England, United Kingdom

Siret is a member of the Douzelage, a town twinning association of towns across the European Union. Siret also has several other twin towns.

Douzelage
 Agros, Cyprus
 Altea, Spain
 Asikkala, Finland
 Bad Kötzting, Germany
 Bellagio, Italy
 Bundoran, Ireland
 Chojna, Poland
 Granville, France
 Holstebro, Denmark
 Houffalize, Belgium
 Judenburg, Austria
 Kőszeg, Hungary
 Marsaskala, Malta
 Meerssen, Netherlands
 Niederanven, Luxembourg
 Oxelösund, Sweden
 Preveza, Greece
 Rokiškis, Lithuania
 Rovinj, Croatia
 Sesimbra, Portugal
 Sherborne, England, United Kingdom
 Sigulda, Latvia
 Škofja Loka, Slovenia
 Sušice, Czech Republic
 Tryavna, Bulgaria
 Türi, Estonia
 Zvolen, Slovakia
Other
 Castiglione in Teverina, Italy
 Celleno, Italy
 Dali, Cyprus
 Dionysos, Greece
 Graffignano, Italy
 Herrera del Duque, Spain
 Hlyboka, Ukraine
 Kamianka, Ukraine
 Wieliszew, Poland
 Wodzisław Śląski, Poland
 Zastavna, Ukraine

Slănic
 Marignane, France

Slatina
 Ispica, Italy

Slobozia

 Nanyang, China
 Razgrad, Bulgaria
 Silistra, Bulgaria
 Veles, North Macedonia

Snagov
 Sarkad, Hungary

Sovata

 Brzesko, Poland
 Budapest XIII (Budapest), Hungary
 Csopak, Hungary
 Mezőberény, Hungary
 Sümeg, Hungary
 Százhalombatta, Hungary
 Szikszó, Hungary
 Tata, Hungary

Suceava

 Bethlehem, Palestine
 Chernivtsi, Ukraine
 Chișinău, Moldova
 Laval, France
 Sosnowiec, Poland

T
Târgoviște

 Castellón de la Plana, Spain
 Căușeni, Moldova
 Corbetta, Italy
 Ciudad Real, Spain
 Gioia del Colle, Italy
 Guilin, China
 Karadeniz Ereğli, Turkey
 Kazanlak, Bulgaria
 Nefteyugansk, Russia
 Santarém, Portugal
 Targovishte, Bulgaria

Târgu Jiu

 Forbach, France
 Lauchhammer, Germany
 Noci, Italy
 Pendik, Turkey
 Yambol, Bulgaria

Târgu Mureș

 Baja, Hungary
 Ilmenau, Germany
 Kecskemét, Hungary
 Kuşadası, Turkey
 Strumyani, Bulgaria
 Szeged, Hungary
 Újbuda (Budapest), Hungary
 Zalaegerszeg, Hungary

Târgu Neamț

 Bilhorod-Dnistrovskyi, Ukraine
 Dondușeni, Moldova
 Khotyn, Ukraine
 Panazol, France
 Saint-Just-Saint-Rambert, France
 Telenești, Moldova

Târgu Secuiesc

 Gyöngyös, Hungary
 Hatvan, Hungary
 Kisvárda, Hungary
 Maassluis, Netherlands
 Mezőhegyes, Hungary
 Mezőkövesd, Hungary
 Nagyatád, Hungary
 Paks, Hungary
 Szentendre, Hungary
 Terézváros (Budapest), Hungary

Târnăveni

 Hajdúszoboszló, Hungary
 Ronchin, France

Tăuții-Măgherăuș

 Aszód, Hungary
 Martfű, Hungary
 Tisovec, Slovakia
 Tuchów, Poland

Timișoara

 Chernivtsi, Ukraine
 Da Nang, Vietnam
 Faenza, Italy
 Gera, Germany
 Graz, Austria
 Karlsruhe, Germany
 Lublin, Poland
 Mulhouse, France
 Nottingham, England, United Kingdom
 Novi Sad, Serbia
 Palermo, Italy
 Porto, Portugal
 Rueil-Malmaison, France
 Szeged, Hungary
 Treviso, Italy
 Trujillo, Peru

Toplița

 Budapest XV (Budapest), Hungary
 Marcali, Hungary

Tulcea

 Aalborg, Denmark
 Altena, Netherlands
 Amasya, Turkey
 Aprilia, Italy
 Fratta Polesine, Italy
 Ilion, Greece
 Izmail, Ukraine
 Larnaca, Cyprus
 Mudanya, Turkey
 Rovigo, Italy
 Shumen, Bulgaria

Turda

 Angoulême, France
 Bihartorda, Hungary
 Hódmezővásárhely, Hungary
 Kiskunfélegyháza, Hungary
 Szydłowiec, Poland
 Torda (Žitište), Serbia

U
Uivar
 Algyő, Hungary

Ungheni
 Carmiano, Italy

V
Vaslui

 Cahul, Moldova
 Quarrata, Italy
 Radoviš, North Macedonia
 San Fernando de Henares, Spain

Vatra Dornei

 Florești, Moldova
 Koziegłowy, Poland
 Yasinia, Ukraine

Vetiș

 Csenger, Hungary
 Szamoskér, Hungary

Vicovu de Sus
 Cesson, France

Vișeu de Sus

 Fürstenfeld, Austria
 Staunton, United States
 Verkhovyna, Ukraine
 Zug, Switzerland

Vlăhița

 Balatonlelle, Hungary
 Balatonboglár, Hungary
 Baracs, Hungary
 Cegléd, Hungary
 Látrány, Hungary
 Szarvas, Hungary

Z
Zalău

 Kamianets-Podilskyi, Ukraine
 Szentendre, Hungary

Zărnești
 Markkleeberg, Germany

Zetea

 Balatonfenyves, Hungary
 Balatonföldvár, Hungary
 Bozsok, Hungary
 Darnózseli, Hungary
 Derekegyház, Hungary
 Grand-Aigueblanche, France
 Gyöngyöspata, Hungary
 Kismányok, Hungary
 Kismaros, Hungary
 Nagymányok, Hungary
 Sárbogárd, Hungary
 Tiszanána, Hungary
 Tvrdošovce, Slovakia

References

Romania
Twin towns
Foreign relations of Romania
Cities in Romania
Populated places in Romania